Zhu Xijuan  is a Chinese film actress. In 1960, Zhang graduated from Shanghai Drama Academy. After the audition of The Red Detachment of Women, she selected as the leading role, which directed by Chinese master Xie Jin. For this breakthrough performance, Zhu won Hundred Flowers Award for Best Actress. In 1962, Zhu listed in the "Ministry of Culture in recognition of the twenty-two stars" (新中国22大明星).

Filmography

References

External links

1938 births
Living people
People from Ganzhou
Actresses from Jiangxi
21st-century Chinese actresses
20th-century Chinese actresses
Chinese film actresses
Chinese television actresses
Shanghai Theatre Academy alumni